Brachodes anatolicus is a moth of the family Brachodidae. It is found in the Sivas Province in Turkey.

References

Moths described in 2001
Brachodidae
Moths of Asia